David James Latter Jr. (January 5, 1922 – October 28, 2000) was an American professional basketball player. He played in the National Basketball League for the Detroit Gems and Detroit Vagabond Kings and averaged 7.6 points per game. He also played minor league baseball in the New York Yankees farm system.

References 

1922 births
2000 deaths
American men's basketball players
United States Army personnel of World War II
Basketball players from Michigan
Beaumont Roughnecks players
Binghamton Triplets players
Detroit Gems players
Detroit Vagabond Kings players
Centers (basketball)
Forwards (basketball)
Muskegon Reds players
People from Leslie, Michigan
Professional Basketball League of America players
Texarkana Twins players